René Gingras (September 16, 1938 - January 8, 2016) was a Liberal party member of the House of Commons of Canada. He was an electrician, businessman and administrator by career.

He was elected in the Quebec riding of Abitibi in the 1980 federal election. After serving his only term, the 32nd Canadian Parliament, he was defeated in the 1984 federal election by Guy St-Julien of the Progressive Conservative party

External links
 

1938 births
2016 deaths
Members of the House of Commons of Canada from Quebec
Liberal Party of Canada MPs
People from Amos, Quebec